Else Marie Karlsen (born Else Marie Christiansen, 13 May 1921 – 19 September 2017) was a Norwegian female speed skater. She won a silver medal at the World Allround Speed Skating Championships for Women in 1947, behind Verné Lesche from Finland. 

She won silver medals at the national allround championships in 1947 and 1948, both times behind Randi Thorvaldsen.

References

External links 
 

1921 births
2017 deaths
Norwegian female speed skaters
World Allround Speed Skating Championships medalists